KVHU (95.3 FM) is a radio station licensed to serve the community of Judsonia, Arkansas. The station is owned by George S. Flinn, Jr., and operated by the Department of Communication's Student Media Network at Harding University. It airs a variety format.

The station was assigned the KVHU call letters by the Federal Communications Commission on May 10, 2006.

References

External links
 Official Website
 

VHU
Variety radio stations in the United States
Radio stations established in 2006
2006 establishments in Arkansas
Harding University